The 1967 Denver Broncos season was the eighth season for the team in the American Football League (AFL). Led by first-year head coach and general manager Lou Saban, the Broncos posted a record of three wins and eleven losses, last in the AFL's Western division. Running back Floyd Little, a first round draft choice (sixth overall), was team captain in his rookie season. After an opening win at home, the Broncos lost nine straight games, then split the last four.

Inter-league play between the AFL and NFL in the exhibition season began this year. In the first matchup on August 5, the Broncos defeated the Detroit Lions 13–7 and became the first AFL team to beat an NFL team.

Before the season, the Broncos changed from orange helmets to blue helmets.

Hired in December 1966, Saban left the University of Maryland after just one season; he had previously been an AFL head coach at Boston and Buffalo, where he won consecutive AFL titles.

Personnel

Staff

Roster

Regular season

Schedule

Thursday (November 23: Thanksgiving)
With the expansion Miami Dolphins joining the AFL in 1966, there were an odd-number (9)of teams for two seasons, resulting in multiple bye weeks for each team.

Game summaries

Week 14

Standings

References

External links
Denver Broncos – 1967 media guide
1967 Denver Broncos at Pro-Football-Reference.com

Denver Broncos seasons
Denver Broncos
1967 in sports in Colorado